Sigramnus (Sigrand), was the Count of Hesbaye.  Sigramnus became Count of Hesbaye by virtue of his marriage to the daughter of Lambert, Count of Hesbaye.  The dates of his rule are unknown but are believed to be between that of Lambert’s son and grandson, and so it was perhaps an interim position until the latter became of age.  The only knowledge available on Sigramnus is through his son, the Bishop of Metz, and grandson Ingerman of Hesbaye, father of Ermengard, wife of Louis the Pious. Sigramnus is known to have been an early supporter of Charles Martel, even before the Battle of Amblève.

Sigramnus married Landrada, daughter of Lambert, Count of Hesbaye.  They had three children:
 Saint Chrodegang, Bishop of Metz
 Gundeland, monk at Gorze
 Sigram of Hesbaye, father of Ingerman, Count of Hesbaye.

Previous histories have portrayed Sigramnus as the husband of the daughter of Charles Martel, but this has been largely discredited. Sigramnus was succeeded by his nephew Cancor as Count of Hesbaye.

References

Sources 

 
Gerberding, Richard A., The Rise of the Carolingians and the Liber Historiae Francorum, Oxford University Press, 1987

Counts of Hesbaye
Year of birth unknown
Year of death unknown